Superstring theory is an attempt to explain all of the particles and fundamental forces of nature in one theory by modeling them as vibrations of tiny supersymmetric strings.

'Superstring theory' is a shorthand for supersymmetric string theory because unlike bosonic string theory, it is the version of string theory that accounts for both fermions and bosons and incorporates supersymmetry to model gravity.

Since the second superstring revolution, the five superstring theories are regarded as different limits of a single theory tentatively called M-theory.

Background
The deepest problem in theoretical physics is harmonizing the theory of general relativity, which describes gravitation and applies to large-scale structures (stars, galaxies, super clusters), with quantum mechanics, which describes the other three fundamental forces acting on the atomic scale.

The development of a quantum field theory of a force invariably results in infinite possibilities. Physicists developed the technique of renormalization to eliminate these infinities; this technique works for three of the four fundamental forces—electromagnetic, strong nuclear and weak nuclear forces—but not for gravity. Development of quantum theory of gravity therefore requires different means than those used for the other forces.

According to the theory, the fundamental constituents of reality are strings of the Planck length (about 10−33 cm) that vibrate at resonant frequencies. Every string, in theory, has a unique resonance, or harmonic. Different harmonics determine different fundamental particles. The tension in a string is on the order of the Planck force (1044 newtons). The graviton (the proposed messenger particle of the gravitational force), for example, is predicted by the theory to be a string with wave amplitude zero.

History

Investigating how a string theory may include fermions in its spectrum led to the invention of supersymmetry (in the West) in 1971, a mathematical transformation between bosons and fermions. String theories that include fermionic vibrations are now known as "superstring theories".

Since its beginnings in the seventies and through the combined efforts of many different researchers, superstring theory has developed into a broad and varied subject with connections to quantum gravity, particle and condensed matter physics, cosmology, and pure mathematics.

Lack of experimental evidence
Superstring theory is based on supersymmetry. No supersymmetric particles have been discovered and recent research at the Large Hadron Collider (LHC) and Tevatron has excluded some of the ranges. For instance, the mass constraint of the Minimal Supersymmetric Standard Model squarks has been up to 1.1 TeV, and gluinos up to 500 GeV. No report on suggesting large extra dimensions has been delivered from LHC. There have been no principles so far to limit the number of vacua in the concept of a landscape of vacua.

Some particle physicists became disappointed by the lack of experimental verification of supersymmetry, and some have already discarded it; Jon Butterworth at University College London said that we had no sign of supersymmetry, even in higher energy region, excluding the superpartners of the top quark up to a few TeV. Ben Allanach at the University of Cambridge states that if we do not discover any new particles in the next trial at the LHC, then we can say it is unlikely to discover supersymmetry at CERN in the foreseeable future.

Extra dimensions

Our physical space is observed to have three large spatial dimensions and, along with time, is a boundless 4-dimensional continuum known as spacetime. However, nothing prevents a theory from including more than 4 dimensions. In the case of string theory, consistency requires spacetime to have 10 dimensions (3D regular space + 1 time + 6D hyperspace). The fact that we see only 3 dimensions of space can be explained by one of two mechanisms: either the extra dimensions are compactified on a very small scale, or else our world may live on a 3-dimensional submanifold corresponding to a brane, on which all known particles besides gravity would be restricted.

If the extra dimensions are compactified, then the extra 6 dimensions must be in the form of a Calabi–Yau manifold. Within the more complete framework of M-theory, they would have to take form of a G2 manifold. A particular exact symmetry of string/M-theory called T-duality (which exchanges momentum modes for winding number and sends compact dimensions of radius R to radius 1/R), has led to the discovery of equivalences between different Calabi–Yau manifolds called mirror symmetry.

Superstring theory is not the first theory to propose extra spatial dimensions. It can be seen as building upon the Kaluza–Klein theory, which proposed a 4+1 dimensional (5D) theory of gravity. When compactified on a circle, the gravity in the extra dimension precisely describes electromagnetism from the perspective of the 3 remaining large space dimensions. Thus the original Kaluza–Klein theory is a prototype for the unification of gauge and gravity interactions, at least at the classical level, however it is known to be insufficient to describe nature for a variety of reasons (missing weak and strong forces, lack of parity violation, etc.) A more complex compact geometry is needed to reproduce the known gauge forces. Also, to obtain a consistent, fundamental, quantum theory requires the upgrade to string theory, not just the extra dimensions.

Number of superstring theories
Theoretical physicists were troubled by the existence of five separate superstring theories. A possible solution for this dilemma was suggested at the beginning of what is called the second superstring revolution in the 1990s, which suggests that the five string theories might be different limits of a single underlying theory, called M-theory. This remains a conjecture.

The five consistent superstring theories are:

 The type I string has one supersymmetry in the ten-dimensional sense (16 supercharges). This theory is special in the sense that it is based on unoriented open and closed strings, while the rest are based on oriented closed strings.
 The type II string theories have two supersymmetries in the ten-dimensional sense (32 supercharges). There are actually two kinds of type II strings called type IIA and type IIB. They differ mainly in the fact that the IIA theory is non-chiral (parity conserving) while the IIB theory is chiral (parity violating).
 The heterotic string theories are based on a peculiar hybrid of a type I superstring and a bosonic string. There are two kinds of heterotic strings differing in their ten-dimensional gauge groups:  the heterotic E8×E8 string and the heterotic SO(32) string. (The name heterotic SO(32) is slightly inaccurate since among the SO(32) Lie groups, string theory singles out a quotient Spin(32)/Z2 that is not equivalent to SO(32).)

Chiral gauge theories can be inconsistent due to anomalies. This happens when certain one-loop Feynman diagrams cause a quantum mechanical breakdown of the gauge symmetry. The anomalies were canceled out via the Green–Schwarz mechanism.

Even though there are only five superstring theories, making detailed predictions for real experiments requires information about exactly what physical configuration the theory is in. This considerably complicates efforts to test string theory because there is an astronomically high number—10500 or more—of configurations that meet some of the basic requirements to be consistent with our world. Along with the extreme remoteness of the Planck scale, this is the other major reason it is hard to test superstring theory.

Another approach to the number of superstring theories refers to the mathematical structure called composition algebra. In the findings of abstract algebra there are just seven composition algebras over the field of real numbers. In 1990 physicists R. Foot and G.C. Joshi in Australia stated that "the seven classical superstring theories are in one-to-one correspondence to the seven composition algebras".

Integrating general relativity and quantum mechanics

General relativity typically deals with situations involving large mass objects in fairly large regions of spacetime whereas quantum mechanics is generally reserved for scenarios at the atomic scale (small spacetime regions). The two are very rarely used together, and the most common case that combines them is in the study of black holes. Having peak density, or the maximum amount of matter possible in a space, and very small area, the two must be used in synchrony to predict conditions in such places. Yet, when used together, the equations fall apart, spitting out impossible answers, such as imaginary distances and less than one dimension.

The major problem with their congruence is that, at Planck scale (a fundamental small unit of length) lengths, general relativity predicts a smooth, flowing surface, while quantum mechanics predicts a random, warped surface, which are nowhere near compatible. Superstring theory resolves this issue, replacing the classical idea of point particles with strings. These strings have an average diameter of the Planck length, with extremely small variances, which completely ignores the quantum mechanical predictions of Planck-scale length dimensional warping. Also, these surfaces can be mapped as branes. These branes can be viewed as objects with a morphism between them. In this case, the morphism will be the state of a string that stretches between brane A and brane B.

Singularities are avoided because the observed consequences of "Big Crunches" never reach zero size.  In fact, should the universe begin a "big crunch" sort of process, string theory dictates that the universe could never be smaller than the size of one string, at which point it would actually begin expanding.

Mathematics

D-branes
D-branes are membrane-like objects in 10D string theory. They can be thought of as occurring as a result of a Kaluza–Klein compactification of 11D M-theory that contains membranes. Because compactification of a geometric theory produces extra vector fields the D-branes can be included in the action by adding an extra U(1) vector field to the string action.

 

In type I open string theory, the ends of open strings are always attached to D-brane surfaces. A string theory with more gauge fields such as SU(2) gauge fields would then correspond to the compactification of some higher-dimensional theory above 11 dimensions, which is not thought to be possible to date. Furthermore, the tachyons attached to the D-branes show the instability of those D-branes with respect to the annihilation. The tachyon total energy is (or reflects) the total energy of the D-branes.

Why five superstring theories?
For a 10 dimensional supersymmetric theory we are allowed a 32-component Majorana spinor. This can be decomposed into a pair of 16-component Majorana-Weyl (chiral) spinors. There are then various ways to construct an invariant depending on whether these two spinors have the same or opposite chiralities:

The heterotic superstrings come in two types SO(32) and E8×E8 as indicated above and the type I superstrings include open strings.

Beyond superstring theory
It is conceivable that the five superstring theories are approximated to a theory in higher dimensions possibly involving membranes. Because the action for this involves quartic terms and higher so is not Gaussian, the functional integrals are very difficult to solve and so this has confounded the top theoretical physicists. Edward Witten has popularised the concept of a theory in 11 dimensions, called M-theory, involving membranes interpolating from the known symmetries of superstring theory. It may turn out that there exist membrane models or other non-membrane models in higher dimensions—which may become acceptable when we find new unknown symmetries of nature, such as noncommutative geometry. It is thought, however, that 16 is probably the maximum since SO(16) is a maximal subgroup of E8, the largest exceptional Lie group, and also is more than large enough to contain the Standard Model. Quartic integrals of the non-functional kind are easier to solve so there is hope for the future. This is the series solution, which is always convergent when a is non-zero and negative:

 

In the case of membranes the series would correspond to sums of various membrane interactions that are not seen in string theory.

Compactification
Investigating theories of higher dimensions often involves looking at the 10 dimensional superstring theory and interpreting some of the more obscure results in terms of compactified dimensions. For example, D-branes are seen as compactified membranes from 11D M-theory. Theories of higher dimensions such as 12D F-theory and beyond produce other effects, such as gauge terms higher than U(1). The components of the extra vector fields (A) in the D-brane actions can be thought of as extra coordinates (X) in disguise. However, the known symmetries including supersymmetry currently restrict the spinors to 32-components—which limits the number of dimensions to 11 (or 12 if you include two time dimensions.) Some physicists (e.g., John Baez et al.) have speculated that the exceptional Lie groups E6, E7 and E8 having maximum orthogonal subgroups SO(10), SO(12) and SO(16) may be related to theories in 10, 12 and 16 dimensions; 10 dimensions corresponding to string theory and the 12 and 16 dimensional theories being yet undiscovered but would be theories based on 3-branes and 7-branes respectively. However, this is a minority view within the string community. Since E7 is in some sense F4 quaternified and E8 is F4 octonified, the 12 and 16 dimensional theories, if they did exist, may involve the noncommutative geometry based on the quaternions and octonions respectively. From the above discussion, it can be seen that physicists have many ideas for extending superstring theory beyond the current 10 dimensional theory, but so far all have been unsuccessful.

Kac–Moody algebras
Since strings can have an infinite number of modes, the symmetry used to describe string theory is based on infinite dimensional Lie algebras. Some Kac–Moody algebras that have been considered as symmetries for M-theory have been E10 and E11 and their supersymmetric extensions.

See also

 AdS/CFT correspondence
 dS/CFT correspondence
 Grand unification theory
 List of string theory topics
 String field theory

References

Cited sources
 
 

String theory
Supersymmetry
Supersymmetric quantum field theory
Physics beyond the Standard Model